Natalia Chernogolova is a Belarusian artist.

Biography
Chernogolova was born on 15 May 1954 in Zhitkovichi, Gomel Region, USSR (now Belarus). She graduated from the Minsk School of Art in 1976 and went on to study in the Art and Drawing Department of the Pedagogical Institute in Vitebsk, graduating in 1982. In 1989 she was elected to the USSR Union of Artists, undertaking various official commissions.

Natalia paints without preliminary sketches or drawings. "Painting is her life. She finds it impossible not to paint. She works with passion and vitality, and her love of life is evident in her work. Natalia has developed a way of painting using only her fingers. This, underpinned by her long classical training, enables her to capture the vigour and spirit that she sees in the subjects she has chosen."

She first visited the United Kingdom in 2005 when she created many vivid oil paintings of street scenes in Congleton and Cheshire landscapes. Her neo-expressionist paintings appear in collections and galleries in the US, UK, Germany, Belarus, Poland, Sweden, Denmark, Australia, Canada and Israel. She lives in Brest, Belarus.

Exhibitions
 1976—1988 — Brest, Minsk — Belarus
 1988 — Gurzufa — Crimea
 1989 — Minsk, Brest — Belarus
 1990 — Minsk, Grodno — Belarus
 1991 — Nałęczów — Poland
 1992 — Nałęczów, Katowice, Puławy, Gołąb — Poland; Brest - Belarus; Ostrowiec, Biała — Poland
 1993 — Zakopane, Krynica, Nałęczów — Poland
 1994 — Nałęczów — Poland; Brest — Belarus
 1995 — Brest — Belarus
 1996 — Zakopane — Poland
 1997 — Brest, Minsk — Belarus
 1998 — Brest, Minsk — Belarus
 1999 — Siedlce — Poland
 2000 — Puławy — Poland
 2001 — Biała — Poland
 2002 — Puławy — Poland
 2005 — Brest — Belarus
 2005 — Galeria Andre (www.galeriaandre.com) — Warsaw and worldwide
 2006 — Manchester Central Library, UK: Colours of Love, 25 July-29 September
 2009 — National Gallery Palace of Art, Minsk, Belarus
 2009 — Landmark Arts Centre, Teddington, UK, 19–21 June
 2010 — Todmorden Fine Art, Todmorden, Lancashire, UK, March
 2014 — Belarusian Palace of Art, Minsk

External links
Natalia Chernogolova official web-site
Natalia Chernogolova. Saatchi Gallery
Belarusian website 
featured artist Natalia Chernogolova. Todmorden Fine Art.
Natalia Chernogolova in a brief video. 16 August 2011

Notes and references

Belarus National State TV and Radio: 
Radio Belarus: 
Galeria Andre: 

1954 births
Living people
20th-century Belarusian artists
21st-century Belarusian artists
Belarusian women artists